XHOP-FM is a radio station on 96.5 FM in Villahermosa, Tabasco. The station is owned by Grupo ACIR and carries its Amor format.

History
XHOP received its concession on August 30, 1979. It was owned by Salvador García de los Santos and broadcast with 39 kW ERP.

The station was sold to Radio XHOP-FM, S.A. de C.V., in the 1990s, and to Radio Integral (the primary concessionaire for Grupo ACIR) in 2000.

References

Radio stations in Tabasco
Villahermosa
Grupo ACIR